Jillian Alice Gallays (born October 20, 1986) is Canadian freestyle wrestler. She won the bronze medal at the 53kg event at the 2014 World Wrestling Championships, and is a 2016 Olympian.

Early life and education
Gallays was born in St. Brieux, Saskatchewan. She was diagnosed as having Dyslexia at a young age. She was raised by a single mother. She attended the University of Saskatchewan where she obtained a degree in Kinesiology and competed on the Saskatchewan Huskies wrestling team, on which she was the captain. She was a two-time CIS National Champion at U of S.

Career
She is a six-time Canadian National Champion. In 2014, competed at the 2014 World Wrestling Championships in the 53-Kilogram division, winning her first round match against Nadzeya Shushko of Belarus by technical fall, her round of 16 match against Lee Shin-hye of South Korea by fall, and her quarterfinal match against Yuliya Blahinya of Ukraine before losing her semifinal match to eventual winner, Saori Yoshida of Japan. Qualifying for the repechage, she won her bronze medal match by defeating Natalia Malysheva of Russia.

In July 2016, she was officially named to Canada's 2016 Olympic team. She lost her first round match to Jong Myong-suk of North Korea. She placed 19th in the women's featherweight freestyle event at the 2016 Summer Olympics.

Personal life
Gallays currently resides in St. Catharines, Ontario, having moved there from Saskatoon in 2014. Her nickname is "Jilla Killa".

References

External links
 

1986 births
Sportspeople from Saskatchewan
Sportspeople from St. Catharines
Canadian female sport wrestlers
World Wrestling Championships medalists
Wrestlers at the 2016 Summer Olympics
Olympic wrestlers of Canada
Wrestlers at the 2014 Commonwealth Games
Commonwealth Games medallists in wrestling
Commonwealth Games bronze medallists for Canada
Living people
20th-century Canadian women
21st-century Canadian women
Medallists at the 2014 Commonwealth Games